The Ross Balcony (also known as Mirador el Infiernillo) is a balcony constructed by Agustín Ross Edwards in 1910. It is located over rocks in the southern part of the beach of Pichilemu, in the Paseo de la Juventud. The waves came up to the balcony until the 1960 Valdivia earthquake.

Agustín Ross designed it with the purpose to view the sea. He constructed groceries near the balcony and became one of the most important places in the rise of the city.

References 

Buildings and structures in Pichilemu
Buildings and structures completed in 1910